John Clinton Stringfellow (26 February 1905 – 4 January 1959) was a New Zealand rugby union player. A fullback and centre, Stringfellow represented Wairarapa and, briefly, Bush at a provincial level, and was a member of the New Zealand national side, the All Blacks, on their 1929 tour of Australia. On that tour, he played seven matches, including two internationals, scoring 16 points in all.

During World War II, Stringfellow served as a private in the 2nd New Zealand Divisional Postal Unit, New Zealand Engineers. He died on 4 January 1959 at Mauriceville, and was buried in the Archer Street Cemetery, Masterton.

References

1905 births
1959 deaths
People from Mid Canterbury
People educated at Timaru Boys' High School
New Zealand rugby union players
New Zealand international rugby union players
Wairarapa rugby union players
Bush rugby union players
Rugby union fullbacks
Rugby union centres
New Zealand military personnel of World War II
Burials at Archer Street Cemetery
Rugby union players from Canterbury, New Zealand